The Barrowland Ballroom (also known as Barrowland) is a dance hall and music venue in Glasgow, Scotland.

History
The original building opened in 1934 in a mercantile area east of Glasgow's city centre, built by Maggie McIver, the "Barras Queen". The area and the ballroom are named after the Glasgow Barrowland market. The building was completely rebuilt after being largely destroyed by fire in 1958, and reopened on 24 December 1960. The Barrowland building includes large street-level halls used for the weekend markets, with a large weatherproof hall above. The front of the building is decorated with a large animated neon sign.

In recent years the ballroom has become a concert venue with a capacity of 1,900 standing, known for its acoustics and its sprung dance floor. Simple Minds filmed the video for their 1983 single, "Waterfront", at Barrowlands. Adjacent to the ballroom itself is the Barrowland Park, where there is a path displaying the names of many artists who have played at the venue. Northern Irish punk band Stiff Little Fingers have played sold-out concerts at the venue every St Patrick's Day since 1992, and recorded their Best Served Loud album there in 2016 to celebrate 25 years at Barrowland.

Bible John

Between 1968 and 1969, three young women (Patricia Docker, Jemima MacDonald and Helen Puttock) were found brutally murdered after nights out at the Barrowland. All three murders were attributed to a man dubbed "Bible John" by police after he was heard referring to the Old Testament to one of his victims. Similarities between the murders led police to believe that they were the work of the same man. The man made contact with all three women at the Barrowland Ballroom, before escorting them home and raping and strangling them within yards of their doorsteps. All three women were menstruating and their handbags were stolen. An investigation failed to find Bible John, and the murders remain unsolved. On the night of the murder of Helen Puttock, Puttock's sister Jeannie Langford was with her and spoke to her sister's suspected killer. Jeannie described Bible John as: "25-35 years old, reddish/fair hair, wore a blue suit and matching trousers with white shirt. Spoke very politely and was very religious". In 2007, following the murder of Angelica Kluk, speculation arose that serial killer Peter Tobin was Bible John, due to similarities in modus operandi. Tobin frequented the Barrowland regularly, and moved to Brighton in late 1969 when the killings ended.

The Barrowland 2
The Barrowland 2 is part of the Barrowland Ballroom and is used both as a bar when larger shows are playing in the main hall and as a venue to host smaller gigs. While it occasionally plays host to smaller or acoustic gigs from more established acts, its usual function is as a venue for small local Glasgow bands. The promoters also host an event showcasing unsigned local acts in the main ballroom every year.

The Barrowland in popular culture
The Barrowland features heavily in the 2015 movie The Legend of Barney Thomson, directed by Robert Carlyle.

It features in part of the opening scene of the 2014 movie God Help the Girl from writer/director Stuart Murdoch (lead singer of indie pop group Belle & Sebastian)

Scottish singer Amy Macdonald has a song about the ballroom, titled Barrowland Ballroom on her 2007 album This Is The Life.

The edifice appears in a number of scenes in The Field of Blood (TV series), a British crime drama television series.

The Barrowland are where young girls are picked up before being murdered in the novel The Quaker by Liam McIlvanney.

Simple Minds named a track after the venue on their 2018 studio album, Walk Between Worlds. Track 6 on the album was named "Barrowland Star" due to their close affinity with the venue.

It features in "Fearful Lightning", an episode of popular detective series Taggart. Some great shots of the exterior and interior of the venue in the late Nineties. Good section showing posters of gigs held there. Smashing Pumpkins with Verve as supporting band, Hothouse Flowers, del Amitri (Thursday 12th April Sold out), Pogues and others.

In April 2021, a mural inspired by Douglas Stuart's Booker Prize-winning novel Shuggie Bain was unveiled on the wall of the Barrowland Ballroom, featuring a boy dancing in the street, together with a quote from the book: "You'll not remember the city, you were too wee, but there's dancing. All kinds of dancing."

References

External links
Official site
Photographs of the Barras
DANCING AT BARROWLANDS (c.1961) (archive film from the National Library of Scotland: SCOTTISH SCREEN ARCHIVE)

1934 establishments in Scotland
Ballrooms in the United Kingdom
Bridgeton–Calton–Dalmarnock
Culture in Glasgow
Dance in Scotland
Music venues in Glasgow
Wrestling venues